This was the ninth season of Barnes Football Club.

Athletic Sports
 Date: 1 April 1871
 Venue: "The football field"
 Committee: O. D. Chapman (treasurer), W. M. Chinnery, W. M. M. Dowdall, F. S. Gulston, L. Karslake, E. C. Morley, F. G. Ommanney, J. Powell (hon. sec.), D. M. Roberts, C. H. Warren, R. W. Willis.
 Events: 100 yards flat race, 400 yards flat race handicap, 1320 yards flat race handicap, (half-mile handicap), 150 yards hurdles, one mile handicap steeplechase, five miles handicap steeplechase (run 18 March), two miles handicap walking, high jump, long jump running, vaulting

Notes

Barnes F.C. seasons
Barnes